Srikalahasti mandal is one of the 34 mandals in Tirupati district of the Indian state of Andhra Pradesh. It is under the administration of Srikalahasti revenue division and the headquarters are located at Srikalahasti. The mandal is bounded by Renigunta, Yerpedu, Narayanavanam and Thottambedus. The mandal was a part of Chittoor district and was reorganised to be a part of newly formed Tirupati district on 4 April 2022.

Government and politics 

Srikalahasti mandal is one of the 4 mandals under Srikalahasti (Assembly constituency), which in turn represents Tirupati (Lok Sabha constituency) of Andhra Pradesh.

Towns and villages 

 census, the mandal has 1 town and 66 villages.

The settlements in the mandal are listed below:

Note: M-Municipality

See also 
 List of mandals in Andhra Pradesh

References

Mandals in Tirupati district